The Miss Internacional Chile or well-known as "Miss Chile International" is an annual national beauty pageant that selects Chile's representative to the Miss International pageant.

History
The Miss Chile International was founded in 1996 by the exclusive of Miss Chile International beauty pageant. The foundation is handing by Giselle Da Costa and Vincent Camacho. The winner is expected to represent Chile at Miss International competition.

Titleholders
Color key

See also
Miss Universo Chile
Miss World Chile
Nuestra Belleza Chile

References

External links
Official website
Miss International Lists (a)

Beauty pageants in Chile
Recurring events established in 1965
Chilean awards